Rakesh Jhunjhunwala (5 July 1960 – 14 August 2022) was an Indian billionaire business magnate, Chartered Accountant, stock trader, and investor. At the time of his death he had an estimated net worth of  billion, making him the 438th richest person in the world. He was a partner in his own asset management firm, Rare Enterprises.

Besides being an active investor, he served as chairperson and  director for several companies. He was also a founder of Akasa Air. He was investigated for insider trading and settled with the Securities and Exchange Board of India (SEBI) in 2021. Jhunjhunwala was often referred to as "India's Warren Buffett" or the "Big Bull of India", and was widely known for his stock market predictions and bullish outlooks.

Early life and education 

Jhunjhunwala was born on 5 July 1960 and grew up in a Rajasthani Marwari family, in Mumbai. His father Radheshyam Jhunjhunwala worked as a Commissioner of Income Tax. His surname indicates that his ancestors belonged to Jhunjhunu in Rajasthan. He graduated from Sydenham College and thereafter enrolled at the Institute of Chartered Accountants of India.

Career 

Jhunjhunwala's interest in stock markets arose when he observed his father discussing the markets with his friends. While his father guided him on the markets, he never gave him money to invest and forbade him from asking friends for money. With his savings at hand, Rakesh investing early when in college. Beginning with 5,000 capital in 1985, Jhunjhunwala's first big profit came in the form of 5 lakh in 1986. Between 1986 and 1989, he earned almost 20–25 lakh profit. By 2022, his investment had grown to 11,000 crores. As of 2021, his biggest investment was in Titan Company which is worth 7,294.8 crore.

He managed his own portfolio as a partner in his asset management firm, Rare Enterprises. Besides being an active investor, Jhunjhunwala was the chairman of Aptech and Hungama Digital Media Entertainment and sat on the board of directors of Prime Focus Limited, Geojit Financial Services, Bilcare Limited, Praj Industries, Provogue, Concord Biotech, Innovasynth Technologies (I) Limited, Mid Day Multimedia Limited, Nagarjuna Construction Company, Viceroy Hotels, and Tops Security Limited.
He was also a member of the Board of Advisors of India's International Movement to Unite Nations (I.I.M.U.N.).

In 2013, Jhunjhunwala bought 6 of the 12 units of Ridgeway apartments at Malabar Hill from Standard Chartered bank for  176 crore. Later in 2017, he bought the other 6 apartments in the building from HSBC for  195 crore. In 2021, he commenced the construction of his new 70,000 square feet 13-storey home after the demolition of the old building.

In July 2021, he invested in Akasa Air, a low-cost airline in India, investing  million for a 40% stake in the airline. As of January 2023, the new airline has 14 aircraft and flies to 11 cities. Before his death Rakesh had increased his stake in the airline to 46% becoming the largest stakeholder in the company.

Controversy

In 2021, Jhunjhunwala was investigated for insider trading, for unusual dealing in shares of Aptech Computers. SEBI had alleged that Jhunjhunwala and others traded in Aptech when in possession of unpublished price sensitive information (UPSI). In September 2016, Aptech had announced its foray into the preschool segment. As per the SEBI order, this was an UPSI between 14 March 2016 and 7 September 2016, the date of official announcement. In July 2021, the SEBI had settled the issue after a total payment of  crore from Jhunjhunwala and his associates. Jhunjhunwala paid  crore and his wife paid  crores.

Philanthropy 

Jhunjhunwala, whose net worth stands at  billion as at the time of his death, had plans to donate a quarter of his wealth to charity. His philanthropic portfolio included health care as well as education-related initiatives, supporting organizations such St Jude, Agastya International Foundation, Ashoka University, Friends of Tribals Society and Olympic Gold Quest. He was also active in efforts to construct R J Sankara eye hospital in New Panvel .

In popular culture 

Similar to the Fake Steve Jobs blog, there is a popular parody blog called The Secret Journal of Rakesh Jhunjhunwala that humorously parodies the investor's life. On 7 June 2012, the authors were revealed by The Economic Times to be two people: For the first year, Mark Fidelman (a Forbes columnist) and for the remaining years, writer Aditya Magal.

In the web series Scam 1992, actor Kavin Dave played a role based on Jhunjhunwala.

Death 

On 14 August 2022, Jhunjhunwala felt ill and was rushed to Breach Candy Hospital in Mumbai, and died at approximately 6:30 a.m. Doctors later reported that he suffered from kidney-related problems and acute multiple organ failure. Indian Prime Minister Narendra Modi shared his condolences stating, "Rakesh Jhunjhunwala was indomitable. Full of life, witty and insightful, he leaves behind an indelible contribution to the financial world. He was also very passionate about India's progress. His passing away is saddening."

Personal life 

Rakesh Jhunjhunwala married Rekha Jhunjhunwala on 22 February 1987. The couple had three children together. Their daughter Nishtha was born on 30 June 2004. Their twin sons Aryaman and Aryaveer were born on 2 March 2009.

References 

31.^Business Tweet. Rakesh Jhunjhunwala will Receive a Padma Shri. Business Tweet. Archived from the original on 01 March 2023. Retrieved 26 January 2023.

External links 

1960 births
2022 deaths
Indian accountants
Indian billionaires
Indian stock traders
Indian investors
Indian financial analysts
Marwari people
Businesspeople from Mumbai
Businesspeople from Hyderabad, India
Recipients of the Padma Shri in trade and industry